Parliamentary elections were held in Norway on 8 October 1945, the first following World War II and the end of the German occupation. The result was a victory for the Labour Party, which won 76 of the 150 seats in the Storting, the first time a party had won a majority since the 1915 elections.

Results

Seat distribution

References

General elections in Norway
1940s elections in Norway
Norway
Parliamentary
Norway